The following lists events in the year 2017 in Belarus.

Incumbents
 President: Alexander Lukashenko
 Prime Minister: Andrei Kobyakov

Events

February
19 February - 2000 people spread the march of the 2017 Belarusian protests from the capital of Minsk to other cities in Belarus against a 2015 tax law.

March
25 March - Despite bans on protests, hundreds protest in Minsk against a so-called "social parasites" tax on the unemployed.

Deaths

28 January – Alexander Tikhanovich, pop singer (b. 1952).

2 August – Alexander Gerasimenko, politician and diplomat (b. 1946)

References

 
2010s in Belarus
Years of the 21st century in Belarus
Belarus
Belarus